Gordon Moodie (born 15 February 1981) is a BriSCA Formula 2 Stock Cars racing driver from Windygates, Fife, Scotland, who races under number 7. Gordon Moodie is the most prolific major title holder in the 60+ year history of the sport.  To date he has won 76 Championships including 3 World Finals and the National Points Championship/National Series 13 times.   He also holds the record of having won 489 feature final wins.

Racing career
Moodie began racing Formula 2 stock cars at the age of 17 in 1998, using one of his father’s cars and racing as number 79. After winning the World Championship in 2006, Moodie elected to race under number 7 in honour of his father, who used that number. Since then, Moodie has retained number 7.

Moodie’s first championship success came at the 2003 Scottish Championship at Cowdenbeath, a success which he regards as the turning point in his career.  In the same season, Moodie won his first National Points Championship.  It was the first of five consecutive National Points Championships, and Moodie also won another five consecutive titles between 2010 and 2014. He regained the National Points title in 2016, and again in 2017, but the silver roof was decided in a new shootout format called the National Series which he clinched at Belle Vue, Manchester.

Moodie finished first in the 2008 World Championship, but was subsequently disqualified and suspended from racing after scrutineering revealed a problem with his carburettor. Moodie proclaimed his innocence and later investigations revealed that there was a manufacturing fault in a batch of carburettors, of which Moodie’s was one. However, Moodie remained suspended and his lack of racing meant that he did not win the National Points Championship in both 2008 and 2009. A four-month ban imposed towards the end of 2014 saw Moodie miss the first half of the 2015 season, ruling him out of contention for the National Points Championship in 2015.

Moodie is the only British driver to have won the World Cup, raced for in August every year at Raceway Venray in the Netherlands, and holds the current record of six wins.

Honours
World Champion: 2006, 2018, 2019
National Points Champion: 2003, 2004, 2005, 2006, 2007, 2010, 2011, 2012, 2013, 2014, 2016, 2017
Inaugural winner of the National Series 2017
Winner of the National Series 2018
World Cup: 2007, 2008, 2009, 2014, 2015, 2019
British Champion: 2007, 2014, 2021
European Champion: 2006, 2009, 2012, 2014, 2022
English Champion: 2005, 2009, 2012, 2018
Scottish Champion: 2003, 2004, 2006, 2008, 2010, 2012, 2013, 2014, 2019
Irish Open Champion: 2008, 2022
Grand National Champion: 2003, 2004, 2006, 2011, 2012, 2013, 2016, 2019
Benevolent Fund Trophy: 2002, 2009, 2015, 2017, 2019
Challenge Trophy:
2006, 2011, 2014, 2022
UK Open Champion: 2006, 2007, 2009, 2011, 2013, 2015, 2018, 2019
Shoot Out Champion: 2014
Gala Champion 2021
BriSCA Nationals Champion 2022
BriSCA Supreme Champion 2022
Shale #lovef2s People’s Trophy 2022
Record Holder 489 Feature Final Wins

Gordon was voted Kirkcaldy and Central Fife Sports Personality of the Year in 2013 and in 2018 and 2019 was presented by Fife Sport & Leisure Trust the Senior Award in recognition for his outstanding achievements in Motorsport.

Notes

References 

Living people
1981 births
Stock car racing in the United Kingdom
Scottish racing drivers